Sapphirinidae is a family of parasitic copepods in the order Cyclopoida.

Description
Males come in a variety of bright and flashy colors. In contrast, the females are transparent. The reason for this sexual dimorphism is that males need to attract the attention of females in order to mate.

Genera
The family Sapphirinidae consists of the following genera:

 Copilia Dana, 1849
 Sapphirina J. Thompson, 1830
 Vettoria C. B. Wilson, 1924

References

External links
 

Poecilostomatoida
Crustacean families